Sonic X is an anime series based on the Sonic the Hedgehog video game series. It originally ran consecutively on Sundays from April 6, 2003 to March 28, 2004 with a total of 52 episodes (collectively known as the Japanese "Series 1"). Episodes 53-78 (collectively known as "Series 2") initially after they were completed and produced, were not aired on TV released on DVD in Japan, but eventually became available through various streaming services years later (episodes 53-78 were first broadcast on TV in France and parts of Asia before they aired on UK/US television).

However, as part of Kids Station's 2020 line-up of programming, it was announced that as part a tie in promotion for the Sonic the Hedgehog movie, the network would finally begin broadcasting the remaining episodes in 2020. This would mark the first time that the episodes would air in any format on Japanese television.

For the English dub produced by 4Kids (which aired on FOX on the Saturday morning block FoxBox, later renamed 4Kids TV from August 23, 2003 to May 6, 2006), episodes 1-52 were referred to as Seasons 1-2, each 26 episodes long, and episodes 53-78 were referred to as Season 3, but the Saga Set DVD releases split the episodes into 6 Seasons, each containing 13 episodes. The airdates for TV Tokyo are listed on the left, while the airdates for the 4Kids English dub are on the right. For Season 3, air dates for the Japanese run reflect the first date of Kids Station's broadcasts.

Series overview

Episode list

Season 1: The New World and Chaos Emerald Sagas (2003–04)

Season 2: The Chaos, Shadow, Egg Moon, Emerl, and Homebound Sagas (2004–05)

Season 3: The Metarex Saga (2005–06)

Theme songs

Japan 
 Opening
 "Sonic Drive"
 April 6, 2003 - March 28, 2004 and April 4, 2004 - September 26, 2004
 Lyricist: Takeshi Aida
 Composer / Arranger: Cher Watanabe
 Singers: Hironobu Kageyama and Hideaki Takatori
 Episode Range: 1-78

 Endings
 
 April 6, 2003 - June 29, 2003
 Lyricist / Composer / Arranger: Kazuyoshi Baba
 Singers: Run&Gun
 Episode Range: 1-13
 
 July 6, 2003 - December 28, 2003 and April 4, 2004 - September 26, 2004
 Lyricist: Shun Taguchi
 Composer / Arranger: Masataka Matsutoya 
 Singer: Aya Hiroshige
 Episode Range: 14-39 and 53-78
" T.O.P."
 January 4, 2004 - March 28, 2004
 Lyricists / Singers: KP
 Composer / Arranger: URU
 Episode Range: 40-52

United States 
Opening
 "Gotta Go Fast"
 August 23, 2003 - May 6, 2006
 By Norman Grossfeld and Russell Velazquez
 Episode Range: 1-78

Ending
 "Gotta Go Fast" (shortened version)
 August 23, 2003 - May 6, 2006
 By Norman Grossfeld and Russell Velazquez

PAL regions 
Opening
 "Sonic X"
 August 23, 2003 - May 6, 2006
 By Marc Biagi and Nikki Gregoroff
 Episode Range: 1-78
Ending
 PAL Regions has the same melody of the American ending theme, with the pitch either lower, higher, or the same.

South Korea 
South Korea has the same melody of the Japanese opening theme and the first ending theme, with the lyrics translated into Korean.

Italy 
"Sonic" (Episodes 1-78)

France 
France has the same melody of the Japanese opening theme, but it is adapted into French lyrics instead.

The first ending is instrumental.

Home video releases

Japan 
A total of 13 DVD and VHS volume compilations was released by Victor Entertainment and Universal Music. "Hi-Spec" editions of volumes 1-10 have also been released, which include bonus features and 5.1 audio.

United States

DVD 
Funimation released episodes 1–52 in 10 single-disc releases:

The episodes were re-released in "Saga" sets:

Episodes 53–78 made their way to the U.S. in two 13-episode box sets:

Blu-ray

United Kingdom 
UK DVD

Warner Home Video and Jetix Consumer Products released only 4 volumes with episodes from 1 to 8.

 Volume 1 – Episode 1–2 ("Chaos Control Freaks" and "Sonic to the Rescue"
 Volume 2 – Episode 3–4 ("Missile Wrist Rampage" and "Chaos Emerald Chaos")
 Volume 3 – Episode 5–6 ("Cracking Knuckles" and "Techno-Teacher")
 Volume 4 – Episode 7–8 ("Party Hardly" and "Satellite Swindle")

Australia
In Australia, 17 volumes of the first series were released by MRA Entertainment in 2005–2006, which featured three episodes per disc.

References

Sonic X episodes
Sonic X episodes
Sonic X